Inacaliri is a mountain in the Andes Mountains, situated on the border of Bolivia and Chile in the Potosí Department and in the Antofagasta Region.

See also
List of mountains in the Andes

References 

Mountains of Chile
Mountains of Potosí Department
Landforms of Antofagasta Region